The Hungary men's national field hockey team represents Hungary in international field hockey competitions.

Tournament record

Summer Olympics
 1936 – 8th place

EuroHockey Championship
1970 – 17th place

EuroHockey Championship III
2005 – 7th place
2021 – Withdrew

EuroHockey Championship IV
2015 – 5th place
2017 – 
2019 –

See also
Hungary women's national field hockey team

References

European men's national field hockey teams
Field hockey
National team
Men's sport in Hungary